Kirlian may refer to:

 Semyon Davidovich Kirlian (1898–1978), Russian inventor and researcher of Armenian descent
 Kirlian photography, a photographic technique, named after Semyon and his wife Valentina Kirlian